Frank Vearing (born 21 November 1943) is a former Australian rules footballer who played with Melbourne in the Victorian Football League (VFL).

Notes

External links 

1943 births
Living people
Australian rules footballers from Victoria (Australia)
Melbourne Football Club players
Epping Football Club players